Starflower is the fourth studio album by American pop singer Jennifer Paige, released on March 31, 2017. Starflower was preceded by the release of three singles, "The Devil's in the Details", "Let Me Love You", and "Forget Me Not".

Background
Paige partnered with producer Jeremy Bose to begin work on her fourth studio album in early 2016. With a crowdfunding campaign on Kickstarter, Paige raised almost $35,000 from her fans to cover album production costs.

Critical reception 
Starflower received positive critical reviews from the music press. Billboard's Andrew Unterberger praised the album as "one of the early year's best pop full-lengths". Starflower was also named as one of the 50 best albums of 2017 so far from Billboard.

Accolades

Track listing

References

2017 albums
Jennifer Paige albums